Lahoma is a 1920 American silent western film directed by Edgar Lewis and starring Peaches Jackson, Wade Boteler and Jack Perrin. It is based on the 1913 novel Lahoma by J. Breckenridge Ellis.

Cast
 Peaches Jackson as Lahoma, as a child
 Louise Burnham as 	Lahoma
 Wade Boteler as 	Henry Gledware
 Lurline Lyons as Mrs. Gledware
 Jack Perrin as 	Will Compton
 Russell Simpson as 	'Brick' Willock
 F.B. Phillips as 	Bill Atkins
 Will Jeffries as Red Feather 
 Yvette Mitchell as 	Red Fawn
 Bert Lindley as 	Red Kimball 
 Jack Carlyle as 	Kansas Kimball

References

Bibliography
 Connelly, Robert B. The Silents: Silent Feature Films, 1910-36, Volume 40, Issue 2. December Press, 1998.

External links
 

1920s American films
1920 films
1920 drama films
1920 Western (genre) films
Silent American Western (genre) films
1920s English-language films
American silent feature films
Silent American drama films
American black-and-white films
Films directed by Edgar Lewis
Pathé Exchange films
Films based on American novels